Domenico Panetti (1460–1530) was an Italian painter of the Renaissance period, active mainly in his native Ferrara. Among his early pupils was Garofalo. He painted a Deposition from the Cross for the church of San Niccolo and a Visitation for San Francesco in Ferrara.

References

Bibliography

1460 births
1530 deaths
15th-century Italian painters
Italian male painters
16th-century Italian painters
Painters from Ferrara
Italian Renaissance painters